Hampton station is a former Canadian National Railway station building in Hampton, New Brunswick, Canada. It is now used as a tourist information centre.

The community obtained rail service in 1859 with the opening of the European and North American Railway to Saint John, connecting to Moncton in 1860. Passenger service continued until 1994. The tracks are still in use for freight as Canadian National Railway operate them as a secondary mainline. There was also rail service to St. Martins in the late nineteenth century on the Hampton and St. Martins Railway.

References

Railway stations in New Brunswick
Buildings and structures in Kings County, New Brunswick
Via Rail stations in New Brunswick
Railway stations in Canada opened in 1921
1921 establishments in New Brunswick
Railway stations closed in 1994